Indian Mound Cemetery is a cemetery located along the Northwestern Turnpike (U.S. Route 50) on a promontory of the "Yellow Banks" overlooking the South Branch Potomac River and Mill Creek Mountain in Romney, West Virginia, United States. The cemetery is centered on a Hopewellian mound, known as the Romney Indian Mound. Indian Mound Cemetery is also the site of Fort Pearsall, the Confederate Memorial, Parsons Bell Tower, and reinterments from Romney's Old Presbyterian Cemetery. The cemetery is currently owned and maintained by the Indian Mound Cemetery Association, Inc.

Indian Mound Cemetery is the burial site of two governors of West Virginia, a United States House Representative, a United States Secretary of the Army, an owner of the Washington Redskins, and descendants of the family of George Washington.

Days before the 150th anniversary of the Confederate Monument's dedication was to be observed, it was vandalized. The vandalism read "reparations now", and was done using black spray paint. The damage to the monument has since been repaired.

History

Romney Indian Mound

Physical description
Since this marker was erected, further research indicates the mound has been opened at some point in the past. It is the largest of the remaining mounds discovered in West Virginia's Eastern Panhandle. The Romney Indian Mound is representative of thousands of small Middle and Late Woodland burial mounds that occurred throughout much of eastern North America. Throughout its history, the Romney Indian Mound has traditionally been covered in pine trees, of which several remain as of 2010.

Origins
The Romney Indian Mound was constructed at what was once the crossroads of the Shawnee Trail, running north and south, and the east-west Indian Road (later the Northwestern Turnpike and U.S. Route 50) leading to the Allegheny Mountains.

The original owner of the mound, David Gibson, gave the site to the city of Romney on the condition that the mound would not be disturbed. For this reason, the city has never allowed the mound to be excavated. The Smithsonian Institution suggests the Romney Indian Mound possibly dates from between 500 and 1000 CE given the ages of similar mounds it excavated in the Eastern Panhandle. The mound was likely constructed by peoples of the Hopewell culture, who resided within West Virginia between 500 BC and 1,000 CE.

The Romney Indian Mound is perhaps the only accessible mound east of the Allegheny Mountains that has been preserved. This is mostly due in part to both its location high above the flood plain of the South Branch Potomac River and that it was never plowed over.

Indian Mound Cemetery Company and Association
Several years prior to the onset of the American Civil War, Romney's Old Presbyterian Cemetery at Gravel Lane and High Street had become full and the city of Romney sought to procure a larger tract for a new spacious cemetery.

Indian Mound Cemetery was incorporated by an act of the Virginia General Assembly around 1859. The land was conveyed to the Indian Mound Cemetery Company by David Gibson on May 31, 1860. The land conveyed by Gibson had previously been a tract of his nearby Sycamore Dale plantation. The cemetery's original design consisted of two plats: the higher plat around the Romney Indian Mound and the lower plat above Sulphur Spring Run reserved for the burials of African Americans. The latter separated from Indian Mound Cemetery and became known as the Mount Pisgah Benevolence Cemetery, which is currently maintained by the Mount Pisgah United Methodist Church.

On May 22, 1869, a meeting was held at the Hampshire County Courthouse to elect a board of directors of the Indian Mound Cemetery Company. The company operated the cemetery until it was incorporated by the state of West Virginia on August 25, 1925, as the Indian Mound Cemetery Association, Inc. The association has been administered by a self-perpetuating board of directors since 1925.

On October 6, 1925, an additional five acres to the north were purchased by the Indian Mound Cemetery Association, Inc. from Hiram C. and Katie Feidner Cooper.

American Civil War

Battle of Romney
Due to its strategic location on a bluff commanding views of the South Branch Potomac River, the Romney Covered Bridge, and the Northwestern Turnpike for half a mile, Indian Mound Cemetery was an important lookout position during the American Civil War. On October 22, 1861, Union Army General Scott ordered General Benjamin Franklin Kelley to concentrate his forces at New Creek (now known as Keyser) and attack and capture Romney. Kelley left New Creek early on the morning of October 27 and the Confederate States Army at Romney began preparations for his arrival. The Confederates planted a twelve-pound rifle cannon and a mountain howitzer in Indian Mound Cemetery ready to fire at the lead of the Union Army column as it emerged from Mechanicsburg Gap in Mill Creek Mountain. The Union forces drove in and advanced to Indian Mound Cemetery where the Confederate forces made a stand and opened fire on the Federals with the twelve-pound rifle cannon and the mountain howitzer. A severe cannonade took place between the artillery of both the Union and Confederate forces for an hour.

Burials
Also during the American Civil War, Indian Mound Cemetery was used as a burial ground by both Union and Confederate armies. The majority of soldiers killed in the vicinity of Romney were buried in blankets in the cemetery, many whose names are unknown. Captain Richard Ashby, the brother of Confederate General Turner Ashby, was interred with all the honors of war under a giant oak tree on July 4, 1861, in Indian Mound Cemetery shortly after his death at nearby Washington Bottom Farm on July 3 from wounds received in a skirmish on the Baltimore and Ohio Railroad. Turner Ashby attended his brother's funeral at Indian Mound Cemetery where his behavior was described in Edward A. Pollard's Southern History of the War as touching:

Ashby's body was removed from the cemetery to Stonewall Cemetery in Winchester, Virginia, in October 1862 where it was reinterred next to Ashby's brother General Turner Ashby. Their grave is marked "The Brothers Ashby."

Confederate Memorial

The Confederate Memorial was erected by local ladies in honor of Hampshire County's Confederate dead and dedicated in Indian Mound Cemetery on September 26, 1867. It is considered one of the oldest, if not the first, permanent memorials to Confederate dead in the United States.

Notable interments

 Stephen Ailes (1912–2001), United States Secretary of the Army
 William Armstrong (1782–1865), United States House Representative from Virginia
 John Rinehart Blue (1905–1965), West Virginia House Delegate from Hampshire County
 William C. Clayton (1831–1915), West Virginia State Senator
 Edna Brady Cornwell (1868–1958), First Lady of West Virginia
 John Jacob Cornwell (1867–1953), 15th Governor of West Virginia
 Marshall S. Cornwell (1871–1898), newspaper editor and publisher, poet, and author
 William B. Cornwell (1864–1926), railroad and timber executive
 John Collins Covell (1823–1887), Principal of the West Virginia Schools for the Deaf and Blind
 Dr. William Henry Foote (1794–1869), Presbyterian clergyman and historian
 Henry Bell Gilkeson (1850–1921), West Virginia State Senator, West Virginia House of Delegates member, Principal of the West Virginia Schools for the Deaf and Blind, and Superintendent of Hampshire County Schools
 John Jeremiah Jacob (1757–1839), first ordained Methodist minister in Hampshire County
 John Jeremiah Jacob (1829–1893), 4th Governor of West Virginia
 Howard Hille Johnson (1846–1913), founder of and educator at the West Virginia Schools for the Deaf and Blind
 James Sloan Kuykendall (1878–1928), West Virginia House Delegate
 George Preston Marshall (1896–1969), owner and president of the Washington Redskins
 Gilbert Proctor Miller (1866–1927), orchardist; founder of Hampshire County's fruit industry
 Alexander W. Monroe (1817–1905), Speaker of the West Virginia House of Delegates and Confederate States Army officer
 George William Washington (1809–1876), gentleman farmer and diarist
 Christian Streit White (1839–1917), Clerk of Court for Hampshire County
 John Baker White (1868–1944), Military officer and West Virginia Board of Control member
 Robert White (1876–1935), Prosecuting Attorney for Hampshire County and West Virginia State Senator
 Joshua Soule Zimmerman (1874–1962), West Virginia House Delegate, Hampshire County Prosecuting Attorney, and orchardist

Image gallery

See also
 List of Hopewell sites
 List of historic sites in Hampshire County, West Virginia
 Mount Pisgah Benevolence Cemetery

References

External links

 Indian Mound Cemetery Inventory
 WVGenWeb Indian Mound Cemetery Page
 
 

 
1859 establishments in Virginia
American Civil War sites in West Virginia
Archaeological sites in West Virginia
Cemeteries in West Virginia
Confederate States of America cemeteries
Hampshire County, West Virginia, in the American Civil War
Hopewellian peoples
Mounds in West Virginia
Northwestern Turnpike
Protected areas of Hampshire County, West Virginia
Romney, West Virginia
Rural cemeteries